Saint Philetus (d. 121) is, along with Saints Lydia, Macedo(n), Theoprepius (Theoprepides), Amphilochius and Cronidas (Cronides), venerated as a Christian martyr.  Philetus was supposedly "...a senator who resided in the province of Illyria and was put to death during the persecution under Emperor Hadrian]..." 

According to the Roman Martyrology, they were martyred in Illyria during the reign of Hadrian.  The Martyrology also states that Philetus was a senator, that Lydia was his wife; Macedo and Theoprepius their sons; Amphilochius a captain; and Cronidas a notary.  Their Acta are considered unreliable.

References

External links
Latin Saints of the Orthodox Patriarchate of Rome

121 deaths
2nd-century Christian saints
Year of birth unknown